Didone abbandonata is a 1742 opera by Johann Adolph Hasse setting the libretto Didone abbandonata by Metastasio. It was first performed at Hubertusburg palace, near Dresden.

Recording
Theresa Holzhauser (Didone), Flavio Ferri-Benedetti (Enea), Valer Barna-Sabadus (Iarba), Magdalena Hinterdobler (Selene), Maria Celeng (Araspe) & Andreas Burkhart (Osmida), Hofkapelle München, Michael Hofstetter, 3CD Naxos 2013

References

Italian-language operas
1742 operas
Operas
Operas by Johann Adolf Hasse
Operas based on the Aeneid